Kumanovo Fortress was a palisade or fortress built in the late 17th Century, in order to
halt the strong Ottoman forces during the great uprisings of 1689 situated in Ottoman Macedonia. On November 26th, 1689 Arambasha Karposh and his rebel forces mounted a defence of Kumanovo Fortress against Selim Giray, but were unsucessful.

See also
Karposh's Rebellion

References 

Ottoman fortifications
Fortifications in North Macedonia
Buildings and structures in Kumanovo
1689 establishments in the Ottoman Empire